Senganishi Dam  is an earthfill dam located in Iwate Prefecture in Japan. The dam is used for irrigation. The dam impounds about 47  ha of land when full and can store 5168 thousand cubic meters of water. The construction of the dam was completed in 1934.

See also
List of dams in Japan

References

Dams in Iwate Prefecture